Gude is a surname. Notable people with the surname include:

Gerard Pierre Laurent Kalshoven Gude (1858–1924), British malacologist
Gilbert Gude, United States Congressman from Maryland
Hans Gude, Norwegian romanticist painter
Marquard Gude, German archaeologist and classical scholar
Olivia Gude, American artist and educator
Anthony Gude, MBA, Industrial Engineer and Businessman

See also
Güde, Pazaryeri, village in the Bilecik Province, Turkey
Gude language